Europe bridge is the name of several bridges in Europe :

In Austria as Europabrücke
Europabrücke, a bridge over the Wipp valley (1963), highest bridge in Europe until 2004 and Millau Viaduct achievement
In Belgium as Pont de l'Europe
 Pont de l'Europe in Huy, over the Meuse (1980) see;
 In Bulgaria and Romania
 New Europe Bridge, over the Danube between  Vidin in Bulgaria and Calafat in Romania (2013)
In France as Pont de l'Europe
 Pont de l'Europe in Orléans, over the Loire (built in 2000) ;
 Pont de l'Europe in Vichy, a dam-bridge over the Allier (1963) see;
 Pont de l'Europe in Avignon over the Rhône (1975) see;
 Pont de l'Europe between Strasbourg (France) and Kehl (Germany) over the Rhine (1953)  
In Germany as Europabrücke
 Europabrücke in Koblenz over the Moselle (1974) ;
 Europabrücke in Frankfurt am Main carrying Bundesautobahn 5 over the Main (1978) ;
 Europabrücke in Hamburg over the Süderelbe (1983) ;
 Europabrücke in Kehl and Strasbourg (France); see France
 Europabrücke in Kelheim over the Danube;
In Romania, the New Europe Bridge connecting to Bulgaria
In Switzerland as Europabrücke
 Europabrücke in Zürich
 Europabrücke in Randa, Switzerland, replaced in 2017 by Charles Kuonen Bridge

Bridges